I Dig the Duke! I Dig the Count! is a 1962 album by Mel Tormé, recorded in tribute to Duke Ellington and Count Basie.

Track listing
 "I'm Gonna Go Fishin'" (Duke Ellington, Peggy Lee) – 2:23
 "Don't Get Around Much Anymore" (D. Ellington, Bob Russell) – 2:29
 "I Like the Sunrise" (D. Ellington, Mercer Ellington) – 3:14
 "Take the "A" Train" (Billy Strayhorn) – 2:52
 "Reminiscing in Tempo" (D. Ellington) – 3:17
 "Just A-Sittin' and A-Rockin'" (D. Ellington, Lee Gaines, Strayhorn) – 2:17
 "Down for Double" (Freddie Green) – 2:31
 "I'm Gonna Move to the Outskirts of Town" (Jacobs, Andy Razaf, Will Weldon) – 2:31
 "Blue and Sentimental" (Count Basie, Mack David, Jerry Livingston) – 3:55
 "Oh, What a Night for Love" (Steve Allen, Neal Hefti) – 3:30
 "Sent for You Yesterday (And Here You Come Today)" (Basie, Eddie Durham, Jimmy Rushing) – 2:40
 "In the Evening (When the Sun Goes Down)" (Leroy Carr, Huddie Ledbetter, Don Raye) – 3:20

Personnel

Performance
Mel Tormé - vocals, drums
Joe Maini - alto saxophone
Bill Perkins - baritone saxophone, tenor saxophone
Teddy Edwards - tenor saxophone
Stu Williamson - valve trombone
Frank Rosolino - trombone
Jack Sheldon - trumpet
Al Hendrickson - guitar
Jimmy Rowles - piano
Joe Mondragon - double bass
Mel Lewis - drums
Shelly Manne
Johnny Mandel - arranger, conductor

Production
Jeff Faville - design
Tom Hughes
Dennis Drake - digital remastering
Val Valentin - engineer
Gary Giddins - liner notes
Russell Garcia - producer
Richard Seidel - reissue producer

References

1960 albums
Mel Tormé albums
Albums arranged by Johnny Mandel
Duke Ellington tribute albums
Verve Records albums
Albums produced by Russell Garcia (composer)
Albums conducted by Johnny Mandel